HD 178845, also known as HR 7271 or rarely 49 G. Telescopii, is a binary star located in the southern constellation Telescopium. At its current distance, HD 178845A's brightness is diminished by 0.22 magnitudes due to interstellar dust.

The primary has an apparent magnitude of 6.13, placing it near the naked eye viewing limit and the companion has an apparent magnitude of 10.9, making it readily visible in medium-sized telescopes. The system was first observed by astronomer Willem Hendrik van den Bos in 1930. As of 1991, HD 178845B is located 7.2" away along a position angle of 320°.

The primary is an evolved red giant with a stellar classification of G8 III. It has 2.35 times the mass of the Sun but at the age of 455 million years, it has expanded to 9.1 times its radius.

References

G-type giants
Binary stars
High-proper-motion stars
Telescopium (constellation)
Telescopii, 49
178845
094398
7271
CD-50 12377